Paromamine 6'-oxidase (btrQ (gene), neoG (gene), kanI (gene), tacB (gene)) is an enzyme with systematic name paromamine:oxygen 6'-oxidoreductase. This enzyme catalyses the following chemical reaction

 paromamine + O2  6'-dehydroparomamine + H2O2

This enzymes participates in biosynthesis of several aminocyclitol antibiotics, including kanamycin, butirosin, neomycin and ribostamycin.

References

External links 
 

EC 1.1.3